Dortmund-Bövinghausen station is a railway station in the Bövinghausen district of the town of Dortmund, located in North Rhine-Westphalia, Germany.

Rail services

References

Railway stations in Dortmund